The Fitzpatrick Center for Interdisciplinary Engineering, Medicine and Applied Sciences—colloquially referred to as FCIEMAS (pronounced "eff-see-mas") —opened in August 2004 on the West campus of Duke University. Research facilities focus on the fields of photonics, bioengineering, communications, and materials science and materials engineering.  The aim of the building was to emphasize interdisciplinary activities and encourage cross-departmental interactions.  The building houses numerous wet bench laboratories (highlighted by a nanotechnology research wing), offices, teaching spaces, and an Irish themed café Twinnie's. FCIEMAS contains: a three-story,  atrium; 206-seat auditorium;  of laboratory space;  of conference space; and the Duke Immersive Virtual Environment (one of seven in the world).  The construction of FCIEMAS took more than three years and cost more than $97 million.

See also 
 Duke University Institute for Genome Sciences and Policy

References

External links

Duke University campus
2004 establishments in North Carolina